Labeo rouaneti is a species of ray-finned fish in the genus Labeo from Guinea.

References 

Labeo
Fish described in 1962